Standard bed sizes are based on standard mattress sizes, which vary from country to country. Bed sizes also vary according to the size and degree of ornamentation of the bed frame. Dimensions and names vary considerably around the world, with most countries having their own standards and terminology. In addition, two mattresses with the same nominal size may still have slightly different dimensions, due to manufacturing tolerances, amount of padding, and support type. While beds are generally rectangular, more specialized shapes may be obtained by special order, such as circular beds. Mattress sizes may differ from bedding sizes.

Nomenclature 
Naming standards on different bed sizes and their corresponding actual measurements can vary across national standards. Examples of such nomenclature are names like "Single", "Double", "Queen" or "King" size. Sometimes the naming standards are further divided by adding adjectives such as "Narrow", "Wide", "Extra Wide", "Long", "Extra Long" and so on, which also can vary across national standards.

For example, a King size bed may measure (in width by length):
  in the UK.
  in New Zealand.
  in Portugal, but is also available in  lengths.
  in Indonesia.
  in Singapore and Malaysia.
  in Australia.
  in India.
  in the US.

Because of the growth of international trade and the above potential cause of confusion, bed sizes are becoming more standardized. In most countries, using the International System of Units, bed dimensions most often appear in centimeters, and often only by width and length. In the United States, Canada and other regions influenced by the former British Empire, dimensions are often in inches.

Europe 

Europe may traditionally have had more variations in national bed size standards than any other part of the world, but in the recent years a few sizes have become more common than others. Bed sizes are defined in centimeters in all European countries, although supplementary Imperial equivalents are sometimes shown in the United Kingdom.

Today, the most common widths sold by pan European retailers are:

  for single beds.
  for double beds.

Today, the  length is the most common bed length sold by pan-European retailers.

France 
In France, single size beds are usually .

The most common sizes for double beds are:
 Valet size 
 Queen size 
 King size

Italy 
In Italy, beds are classified by name and use the term  as in "place". Standard sizes are:
  (literally "French 1 places"): 

Northern Europe 
These sizes are for Austria, Switzerland, Liechtenstein, Germany, Poland, Belgium, Netherlands, Luxembourg, Norway, Sweden, Denmark, Iceland, Finland, Estonia, Latvia, and Lithuania. There are some variations between different countries, but these are the most common sizes.

 Single:
 , mainly for double beds with two separate mattresses.
 , mainly for young peoples beds/ bunk beds and double beds with two separate mattresses.
 , common single bed. Extended variants are typically .
 , new common single bed size. 
 , uncommon, often as futon beds that are sold with mattress, slats and frame.
 , common, especially among young people.
 Double:
 
 , common, often with two separate mattresses.
 , most common double bed, often with two separate mattresses.
 , a common extra-wide bed, often with two separate mattresses.

Netherlands 

 Single:
 , small single bed.
 , average single bed.
 , average single bed.
 , average single bed.
 , large single bed.
 , large single bed.
 , large single bed.
 Double:
 , small double bed ("twijfelaar").
 , average double bed.
 , average double bed.
 , average double bed.
 , large double bed.
 , large double bed.
 , large double bed.
 , extra large double bed.
 , extra large double bed.
 , extra large double bed.

Portugal 
In Portugal, the most common widths for beds are:

  (single):  or 
  (double): 
 Queen size: 
 King size: 
 Super king size: 

Spain 
The most common bed sizes are:

 individual (single): 
  (double, literally "matrimonial"):

UK and Ireland 

In the United Kingdom and Ireland, beds are measured according to the size of mattress they hold, not the dimensions of the bed frame itself; bed frame sizes are not standardized and may differ between manufacturers. Listed below are the typical bed sizes from the National Bed Federation, which is the trade association for the majority of British and Irish bed manufacturers and their suppliers. Most NBF manufacturers use designs dimensioned in feet and inches with the metric indicators not being exact equivalents. There can legally be a tolerance of up to ± between the quoted measurements and the size of the mattress itself.

.

Some UK retailers may have a "queen" size which refers to one of the above standard sizes, but there is inconsistency around which size specifically, with both the small double and super king being prevalent.

As well as customary UK sizes, some common European sizes can be found in the UK from imports and IKEA. In 2015, IKEA started offering beds and mattresses in customary UK sizes alongside their standard European sizes.

Turkey 

In Turkey, single size beds are usually .
Long single size 
Large single size 

There is also an intermediate size used for one and a half people in Turkey. 

The most common sizes for double beds are:
Small double size 
Young size 
Double size 
Double size 
Double Large size 
Double XL size

North America

The sizes of mattresses use non-numeric labels such as a "king" or "full", but are defined in inches. Historically most beds were "twins" or "doubles" but in the mid-1940s larger mattresses were introduced by manufacturers. These were later standardized as "queen" and "king", and first made a significant impact on the market in the 1950s and 60s. Below are the standard ISPA widths and heights in the United States and Canada.

While the dimensions are specified to the half-inch below, the actual dimension used by manufacturers or various websites may be half an inch larger or smaller.

Less common sizes include:

There are also a number of specialty sizes for specific use cases:

Bedding in the United States must state the type of bed it is intended for, in addition to the dimensions in both inches and centimeters.

Oceania

Australia
The following bed sizes are available in Australia.

New Zealand
The following bed sizes are available in New Zealand.

Africa

South Africa
In South Africa, bed sizes have standard lengths of either , with the latter being called XL variants. XL mattresses have the same widths as their non-XL counterparts.

Equal to the width of two single mattresses.
Available in XL length only.

Asia

China 
In China, the following sizes are standard:

 Lengths: 
 Single bed widths: 
 Double bed widths: 

In practice, bed sizes are usually categorized by the width. The length is typically , but this may vary. The most common sizes are:
 
 
 
Other bed sizes are available, which are less common however.

Indonesia 
In Indonesia, the standard length is always . The following market-standard sizes are commonly available in Indonesia:

 Single 
 Double or twin 
 Queen 
 King 
 Super King

Japan 
Standard Japanese bedding sizes are described in the standard JIS S 1102:2017 Beds for domestic use by the Japanese Standards Association.

Malaysia / Singapore 
Standard bed sizes in Malaysia and Singapore

Pakistan 
Standard bed sizes in Pakistan.
 Single: 
 Single XL: 
 Double: 
 Double XL: 
 Queen: 
 King: 
 Super King:

Taiwan 
There are five common bed sizes in Taiwan, locally known as 3 footer, 3.5 footer, 5 footer, 6 footer and 7 footer. They are also known as Taiwanese small single, twin, full, queen and king respectively.

However, American beds are also popular in Taiwan. Bedroom furniture and bedding of U.S. standard sizes can be purchased in major cities there.

See also
Infant bed
Toddler bed
Bed sheet

References

External links

Beds
Mattresses
Mechanical standards